Ladislav Quis (7 February 1846, Čáslav – 1 September 1913, Černošice) was a Czech writer, poet, lawyer, journalist, translator and critic; associated with the literary group, Ruchovci.

Biography 
He was born to the city physician, Ignác Quis, and his wife Veronika, née Matieková. His education began at a grammar school in Prague, then continued at the gymnasium in Tábor, during the time its Director was the well known Czech patriot, .

At this time, he was already engaged in literary activities; creating a literary association (Slavoj), and a magazine (Lužnice). In 1865, he published his first poems and short stories in Tábor (a local magazine that was published until 1941). After graduating, he returned to Prague to study law, and received his doctorate in 1874.

In 1872, he began work as an editor at the magazine, Slovan, replacing Karel Sabina, who went into hiding, under suspicion of being a police informant. There, he mainly wrote literary articles and  feuilletons. After a relatively short time, he left to join the newspaper, Národních listů. He was eventually forced to give up journalism, due to an eye disease. After 1881, he worked as a lawyer in Čáslav then, in 1884, moved to Přelouč, where he settled and started a practice.

He established a good reputation there, and was involved in many civic projects, including a library (1902) and a new evangelical church, with an impressive tower (1905).

He also provided articles for several almanacs.

References

Further reading 
 Jiří Opelík, Lexikon české literatury : osobnosti, díla, instituce, Academia, Prague, 2000 
 Josef Tomeš, Český biografický slovník XX. století, Paseka ; Petr Meissner, Prague, 1999

External links 

 "Za Ladislavem Quisem" (obituary) from Zlatá Praha @ Ústav pro českou literaturu 
 Works relating to Quis @ the National Library of the Czech Republic
 Works and translations by Quis @ Kramerius

1846 births
1913 deaths
Czech writers
Czech poets
Czech journalists
Czech translators
Czech literary critics
20th-century Czech lawyers
People from Čáslav
19th-century translators
19th-century Czech lawyers